{{DISPLAYTITLE:C3H3NO}}
The molecular formula C3H3NO (molar mass: 69.06 g/mol, exact mass: 69.02146 u) may refer to:

 Acetyl cyanide
 Isoxazole
 Oxazole
 Propiolic acid amide